Mesudiye, formerly Hamidiye, (in Greek Μεσουδιέ and Μιλάς) is a town and district of Ordu Province in the Black Sea region of Turkey. According to the 2000 census, population of the district is 28,551 of which 5,665 live in the town of Mesudiye.

Mesudiye is a large area of hilly countryside, villages and pasture far inland from the Black Sea coast, south-west of the city of Ordu, in the direction of Sivas. This is a low-income district that since the 1950s has seen successive generations migrate away to jobs in Istanbul and elsewhere. Today Mesudiye itself is a small town of 5,600 people and the whole district is sparsely populated, although busier in summer with returning Mesudiye families on vacation. Efforts are being made by the state to boost the local economy including the opening of a college of a higher education college. Mesudiye is a home to sizeable Chepni Turkmen population. also, was capital of Chepni Beylik Hacıemiroğulları.

History
Mesudiye has been inhabited since the Iron Age era and has numerous remains from the time of the Hittites and there are a number of rock tombs from early antiquity in the area. When it was brought into the Ottoman Empire by Mehmed II in 1455 the area was a collection of mountain villages centred on the slightly larger village and market place known then as Milas. This was renamed Hamidiye in 1876 and then Mesudiye in 1908.  According to Bryer and Winfield, the later Greek name for Mesudiye (or Hamidiye) was Meletios, Melet, or Milas (Grk: Μελέτιος, Μελέτ, or Μήλας), probably derived from the Melanthios River(Melet Irmak) which runs through it and down to Ordu.

Villages
The villages of Mesudiye district include Abdili, Alanköy, Arıcılar, Arıkmusa, Armutkolu, Arpaalan, Aşağıgökçe, Mesudiye, Aşıklı, Balıklı, Bayırköy, Bayraklı, Beşbıyık, Beyağaç, Beyseki, Birebir, Celalköy, Çaltepe, Çardaklı, Çavdar, Çerçi, Çitliksarıca, Çukuralan, Darıcabaşı, Dayılı, Derebaşı, Doğançam, Dursunlu, Erikköy, Esatlı, Göçbeyi, Gülpınar, Güneyce, Güvenli, Güzelce, Güzle, Hamzalı, Herközü, Ilışar, Kaleköy, Karabayır, Karacaören, Kavaklıdere, Kışlacık, Konacık, Mahmudiye, Musalı, Pınarlı, Sarıca, Sarıyayla, Topçam Köyü, Türkköyü, Yağmurlar, Yardere, Yavşan, Yeșilce, Yeşilçit, Yeveli, Yukarıgökçe, and Yuvalı.

References

Notes

External links
  District governor's official website
  District municipality's official website
 Road map of Mesudiye and environs
 Various images of Mesudiye, Ordu
 Melet (Mesudiye)

 
Populated places in Ordu Province
Districts of Ordu Province